Louise Arseneault  is a Canadian psychologist and Professor of Developmental Psychology in the Social, Genetic & Developmental Psychiatry Centre in the Institute of Psychiatry, Psychology and Neuroscience at King's College London, where she has taught since 2001.  

She was appointed a Mental Health Leadership Fellow in 2016 at the Economic and Social Research Council in London. In that capacity, she advanced the importance of the social sciences within the mental health research community. Regarding the challenges that the issue of mental health poses for our society, communities and individuals, Arseneault's expertise contributed leadership on ways that research can make contributions to the field. Part of her fellowship allowed her to pursue her own research project, which studied the impact of social relationships on mental health and wellness.

She was elected a Fellow of the Academy of Medical Sciences in 2018.

Arseneault is known for her research on mental disorders, substance abuse, and the mental health effects of childhood bullying.

Selected publications

References

External links

Living people
Canadian women psychologists
Canadian psychologists
Developmental psychologists
Academics of King's College London
Université de Montréal alumni
Fellows of the Academy of Medical Sciences (United Kingdom)
Year of birth missing (living people)
Place of birth missing (living people)